Kurandella is a genus of planthoppers belonging to the family Achilidae.

Species
Species:
 Kurandella nigromaculata Fennah, 1950

References

Achilidae